Ilsenburg station is a railway station in the municipality of Ilsenburg, located in the Harz district in Saxony-Anhalt, Germany.

References

Railway stations in Saxony-Anhalt
Buildings and structures in Harz (district)